Metal Gathering Tour Live in Japan 2010 is a Japan-only live video by the all-female tribute band The Iron Maidens. Recorded live during their tour in Japan in January 2010, it was the band's first release with new lead vocalist Kirsten Rosenberg and new guitarist Courtney Cox, and also the last to feature guitarist Sara Marsh, who was released from the band after this tour.

Track listing
All songs written by Steve Harris except where indicated.

Disc 1
 Opening
 "Invaders"
 "Die With Your Boots On" (Bruce Dickinson, Adrian Smith, Harris)
 "The Trooper"
 "Flight of Icarus" (Dickinson, Smith)
 "Revelations" (Dickinson)
 "Killers" (Paul Di'Anno, Harris)
 "Wasted Years" (Smith)
 "Alexander the Great"
 "Losfer Words (Big 'Orra)"
 "The Number of the Beast"
 "The Wicker Man" (Dickinson, Smith, Harris)
 "The Evil That Men Do" (Dickinson, Smith, Harris)
 "Hallowed Be Thy Name"
 Mini Murray's Shamisen
 "The Prisoner" (Smith, Harris)
 "22 Acacia Avenue" (Smith, Harris)
 "Phantom of the Opera"
 "Run to the Hills"
 Ending

Disc 2
 "Wasted Years" (Encore song at Holiday Osaka)(Smith)
 "Moonchild" (Encore song at Holiday Nagoya) (Dickinson, Smith)
 Interview
 Tomei Highway (Behind the Scenes of Tour)

Personnel
 Kirsten Rosenberg (a.k.a. Bruce Chickinson) - Lead vocals
 Courtney Cox (a.k.a. Adriana Smith) - Guitar
 Sara Marsh (a.k.a. Mini Murray) - Guitar 
 Wanda Ortiz (a.k.a. Steph Harris) - Bass
 Linda McDonald (a.k.a. Nikki McBurrain) - Drums

References

2010 video albums
Live video albums